Emily Couric (June 5, 1947 – October 18, 2001) was a Virginia Democratic state senator from Charlottesville.

Life and career 
Couric was born to Elinor (Hene) Couric, a homemaker and part-time writer, and John Martin Couric, a public relations executive and news editor at The Atlanta Journal-Constitution and United Press International in Washington, D.C. Although her mother was Jewish, she converted to Presbyterianism, and Couric was raised in her father's Presbyterian faith, like her siblings. Couric's maternal grandparents, Bert Hene and Clara L. Froshin, were the children of Jewish immigrants from the German Empire, mostly in Germany at present. Couric was the sister of Clara Couric Batchelor, John M. Couric, Jr., and former CBS Evening News anchor Katie Couric. Before Couric was married to Dr. George A. Beller, she was married to attorney R. Clark Wadlow, with whom she had two children, oncologist Raymond C. Wadlow, and filmmaker Jeff Wadlow.

Death 
Couric died of pancreatic cancer in October 2001.

Legacy 
Emily Couric Clinical Cancer Center at the University of Virginia Health System's hospital, pays tribute to Couric's efforts to obtain funds for cancer care and research in Virginia.

Couric's papers are held at the Albert and Shirley Small Special Collections Library at the University of Virginia.

References 

1947 births
2001 deaths
American people of German-Jewish descent
Deaths from cancer in Virginia
Deaths from pancreatic cancer
Democratic Party of Virginia chairs
Politicians from Atlanta
Politicians from Charlottesville, Virginia
Presbyterians from Georgia (U.S. state)
Presbyterians from Virginia
Smith College alumni
Democratic Party Virginia state senators
Women state legislators in Virginia
20th-century American politicians
20th-century American women politicians